Vera Vyacheslavovna Koval (born 22 October 1983 in Bryansk) is a Russian judoka, who played for the half-middleweight category. She won two medals (silver and bronze) for her division at the 2009 European Judo Championships in Tbilisi, Georgia, and at the 2010 European Judo Championships in Vienna, Austria. She also competes in women's sumo, including at the World Championships.

Career 
Koval represented Russia at the 2008 Summer Olympics in Beijing, where she competed for the women's half-middleweight class (63 kg). Unfortunately, she lost the first preliminary match to Netherlands' Elisabeth Willeboordse, who successfully scored a yuko and a morote gari (two hand reap) at the end of the five-minute period.

References

External links
 
 

 NBC Olympics Profile

Russian female judoka
Living people
Olympic judoka of Russia
Judoka at the 2008 Summer Olympics
Sportspeople from Bryansk
1983 births
World Games bronze medalists
Competitors at the 2013 World Games
Russian sumo wrestlers
Female sumo wrestlers